The Chicago White Sox' 2007 season started off with the White Sox trying to re-claim the AL Central title, an achievement they last achieved in 2005, when they went on to win the 2005 World Series. They failed to win consecutive AL Central championships when the Minnesota Twins won it in 2006. They finished the season 72-90, 4th place in the AL Central. Notable events include Mark Buehrle pitching a no-hitter on April 18, 2007.

On August 12, 2007, closer Bobby Jenks retired his 41st consecutive hitter, Yuniesky Betancourt, to tie the Major League record for most consecutive hitter retired in a row. He is tied with Jim Barr, who set it with the San Francisco Giants over two games on August 23, 1972, and August 29, 1972.

On September 16, 2007 Jim Thome hit his 500th career home run with a two-run shot in the bottom of the 9th inning to beat the Los Angeles Angels of Anaheim 9-7. Thome is the first player in club history to hit his 500th career home run while in a White Sox uniform.

With their 72-90 record, the White Sox finished with their first losing season since 1999.

2007 off-season 
The 2006–2007 offseason stirred up controversy among Sox fans. First, on November 16, lefty reliever Neal Cotts was sent to the Chicago Cubs for reliever David Aardsma and prospect Carlos Vásquez. This was the first deal between the crosstown rivals since the Cubs traded pitcher Jon Garland for White Sox reliever Matt Karchner in the middle of the 1998 season.

A deal that involved trading Garland to the Houston Astros for outfielder Willy Taveras and pitchers Taylor Buchholz and Jason Hirsh was reported to have been agreed upon, but general manager Ken Williams backed out of the trade at the last minute, due to health concerns for Buchholz.

Williams traded first baseman Ross Gload to the Kansas City Royals for reliever Andrew Sisco.

On December 6, starting pitcher Freddy García was traded to the Philadelphia Phillies for pitching prospects Gavin Floyd and Gio González, who was initially traded to the Phillies by the White Sox in the Jim Thome deal a year prior.

Even more controversial was the December 23 deal that sent highly touted starter Brandon McCarthy, along with outfield prospect David Paisano, to the Texas Rangers for pitching prospects John Danks, Nick Masset, and Jacob Rasner. To some, it seemed as if Williams was sacrificing the present for the future in these deals.

The Sox also signed free agent catcher Toby Hall, signed free agent outfielder/first baseman Darin Erstad, and signed Javier Vázquez to a 3-year, $33 million contract extension.

Regular season

Season standings

Record vs. opponents

Game log 

|- style="background-color:#ffbbbb"
| 1 || April 2 || Indians || 5–12 || Sabathia (1–0) || Contreras (0–1) || || 2:51 || 38,088 || 0–1 || box
|- style="background-color:#ffbbbb"
| 2 || April 4 || Indians || 7–8 || Fultz (1–0) || Thornton (0–1) || Borowski (1) || 3:29 || 26,337 || 0–2 || box
|- style="background-color:#bbffbb"
| 3 || April 5 || Indians || 4–3 ||Jenks (1–0) || Hernández (0–1) || || 2:54 || 24,141 || 1–2 || box
|- style="background-color:#bbbbbb"
| – || April 6 || Twins ||colspan=8| Postponed (cold weather), 
|- style="background-color:#bbffbb"
| 4 || April 7 || Twins || 3–0 || Vázquez (1–0) || Silva (0–1) || Jenks (1) || 2:51 || 33,278 || 2–2 || box
|- style="background-color:#ffbbbb"
| 5 || April 8 || Twins || 1–3 || Santana (2–0) || Danks (0–1) || Nathan (3) || 2:36 || 27,653 || 2–3 || box
|- style="background-color:#bbffbb"
| 6 || April 9 || @ Athletics || 4–1 || Contreras (1–1) || Harden (1–1) || || 2:38 || 35,077 || 3–3 || box
|- style="background-color:#ffbbbb"
| 7 || April 10 || @ Athletics || 1–2 || Street (1–0) || Jenks (1–1) || || 2:37 || 15,153 || 3–4 || box
|- style="background-color:#bbffbb"
| 8 || April 11 || @ Athletics || 6–3 || Aardsma (1–0) || Street (1–1) || Jenks (2) || 2:32 || 19,130 || 4–4 || box
|- style="background-color:#bbffbb"
| 9 || April 13 || @ Indians || 6–4 || Vázquez (2–0) || Carmona (0–1) || Jenks (3) || 3:17 || 16,789 || 5–4 || box
|- style="background-color:#ffbbbb"
| 10 || April 14 || @ Indians || 0–4 || Byrd (1–0) || Danks (0–2) || Borowski (4) || 2:50 || 18,082 || 5–5 || box
|- style="background-color:#ffbbbb"
| 11 || April 15 || @ Indians || 1–2 || Sabathia (3–0) || Contreras (1–2) || Borowski (5) || 2:34 || 14,887 || 5–6 || box
|- style="background-color:#ffbbbb"
| 12 || April 17 || Rangers || 1–8 || Tejeda (2–1) || Garland (0–1) || || 2:28 || 23,139 || 5–7 || box
|- style="background-color:#bbffbb"
| 13 || April 18 || Rangers || 6–0 || Buehrle (1–0) || Millwood (2–2) || || 2:03 || 25,390 || 6–7 || box
|- style="background-color:#bbffbb"
| 14 || April 19 || Rangers || 6–4 || Thornton (1–1) || Feldman (1–1) || Jenks (4) || 2:42 || 25,459 || 7–7 || box
|- style="background-color:#bbffbb"
| 15 || April 20 || @ Tigers || 5–4 || Masset (1–0) || Grilli (0–1) || Jenks (5) || 2:59 || 40,685 || 8–7 || box
|- style="background-color:#bbffbb"
| 16 || April 21 || @ Tigers || 7 – 5  || Aardsma (2–0) || Rodney (1–2) || Jenks (6) || 3:09 || 39,618 || 9–7 || box
|- style="background-color:#ffbbbb"
| 17 || April 22 || @ Tigers || 5 – 6  || Grilli (1–1) || Masset (1–1) || || 3:27 || 38,379 || 9–8 || box
|- style="background-color:#bbffbb"
| 18 || April 23 || @ Royals || 7–4 || Buehrle (2–0) || Gobble (0–1) || Jenks (7) || 2:58 || 12,265 || 10–8 || box
|- style="background-color:#bbffbb"
| 19 || April 24 || @ Royals || 9–7 || Logan (1–0) || Soria (1–1) || Jenks (8) || 3:27 || 14,907 || 11–8 || box
|- style="background-color:#ffbbbb"
| 20 || April 25 || Tigers || 2–6 || Durbin (1–1) || Danks (0–3) || Jones (8) || 2:41 || 26,342 || 11–9 || box
|- style="background-color:#bbbbbb"
| – || April 26 || Tigers ||colspan=8| Postponed (rain), 
|- style="background-color:#bbffbb"
| 21 || April 27 || Angels || 7–3 || Contreras (2–2) || Santana (2–3) || || 2:54 || 30,193 || 12–9 || box
|- style="background-color:#ffbbbb"
| 22 || April 28 || Angels || 0–3 || Weaver (1–2) || Garland (0–2) || Rodríguez (7) || 2:39 || 38,208 || 12–10 || box
|- style="background-color:#ffbbbb"
| 23 || April 29 || Angels || 2–5 || Escobar (1–0) || Buehrle (2–1) || Rodríguez (8) || 2:30 || 38,513 || 12–11 || box

|- style="background-color:#ffbbbb"
| 24 || May 1 || @ Mariners || 2–5 || Washburn (2–2) || Vázquez (2–1) || Putz (5) || 2:21 || 20,739 || 12–12 || box
|- style="background-color:#ffbbbb"
| 25 || May 2 || @ Mariners || 2–3 || Batista (3–2) || Danks (0–4) || Putz (6) || 2:03 || 16,555 || 12–13 || box
|- style="background-color:#ffbbbb"
| 26 || May 4 || @ Angels || 1–5 || Escobar (3–1) || Contreras (2–3) || Shields (2) || 2:23 || 44,126 || 12–14 || box
|- style="background-color:#bbffbb"
| 27 || May 5 || @ Angels || 6–3 || Garland (1–2) || Lackey (4–1) || Jenks (9) || 2:41 || 42,574 || 13–14 || box
|- style="background-color:#bbffbb"
| 28 || May 6 || @ Angels || 4 – 3  || Thornton (2–1) || Rodríguez (0–2) || Jenks (10) || 2:57 || 42,017 || 14–14 || box
|- style="background-color:#ffbbbb"
| 29 || May 8 || @ Twins || 4 – 7  || Rincón (2–0) || Sisco (0–1) || || 3:10 || 21,979 || 14–15 || box
|- style="background-color:#bbffbb"
| 30 || May 9 || @ Twins || 6–3 || Danks (1–4) || Ortiz (3–3) || Jenks (11) || 2:29 || 24,367 || 15–15 || box
|- style="background-color:#bbffbb"
| 31 || May 10 || @ Twins || 3–0 || Contreras (3–3) || Silva (2–3) || || 2:14 || 23,663 || 16–15 || box
|- style="background-color:#bbffbb"
| 32 || May 11 || Royals || 2–1 || Garland (2–2) || Pérez (2–4) || Jenks (12) || 2:20 || 34,522 || 17–15 || box
|- style="background-color:#bbffbb"
| 33 || May 12 || Royals || 5 – 4  || MacDougal (1–0) || Duckworth (0–3) || || 3:21 || 36,702 || 18–15 || box
|- style="background-color:#ffbbbb"
| 34 || May 13 || Royals || 1–11 || de la Rosa (4–3) || Vázquez (2–2) || || 3:01 || 34,468 || 18–16 || box
|- style="background-color:#bbbbbb"
| – || May 15 || Yankees || colspan=8|Postponed (rain) 
|- style="background-color:#bbffbb"
| 35 || May 16 || Yankees || 5–3 || Danks (2–4) || Mussina (2–2) || Thornton (1) || 2:38 || 30,953 || 19–16 || box
|- style="background-color:#ffbbbb"
| 36 || May 16 || Yankees || 1–8 || Wang (2–3) || Contreras (3–4) || || 3:00 || 34,609 || 19–17 || box
|- style="background-color:#bbffbb"
| 37 || May 17 || Yankees || 4–1 || Garland (3–2) || DeSalvo (1–1) || Jenks (13) || 2:48 || 30,488 || 20–17 || box
|- style="background-color:#ffbbbb"
| 38 || May 18 || @ Cubs || 3–6 || Lilly (4–2) || MacDougal (1–1) || Dempster (9) || 2:36 || 40,874 || 20–18 || box
|- style="background-color:#ffbbbb"
| 39 || May 19 || @ Cubs || 6–11 || Howry (1–3) || Aardsma (2–1) || || 2:43 || 41,101 || 20–19 || box
|- style="background-color:#bbffbb"
| 40 || May 20 || @ Cubs || 10–6 || Masset (2–1) || Zambrano (4–4) || || 3:02 || 41,164 || 21–19 || box
|- style="background-color:#bbffbb"
| 41 || May 21 || Athletics || 8–5 || Contreras (4–4) || Blanton (4–2) || Jenks (14) || 3:07 || 35,327 || 22–19 || box
|- style="background-color:#bbffbb"
| 42 || May 22 || Athletics || 10–4 || Danks (2–4) || Lewis (0–1) || || 2:31 || 34,122 || 23–19 || box
|- style="background-color:#ffbbbb"
| 43 || May 23 || Athletics || 0–4 || Gaudin (4–1) || Garland (3–3) || || 2:35 || 29,051 || 23–20 || box
|- style="background-color:#bbffbb"
| 44 || May 25 || Devil Rays || 5–4 || Jenks (2–1) || Orvella (0–2) || || 2:50 || 34,538 || 24–20 || box
|- style="background-color:#bbbbbb"
| – || May 26 || Devil Rays ||colspan=8| Postponed (rain), 
|- style="background-color:#ffbbbb"
| 45 || May 27 || Devil Rays || 5–11 || Kazmir (3–2) || Vázquez (2–3) || || 3:18 || 38,103 || 24–21 || box
|- style="background-color:#ffbbbb"
| 46 || May 28 || @ Twins || 4–10 || Santana (6–4) || Contreras (4–5) || || 2:59 || 27,090 || 24–22 || box
|- style="background-color:#ffbbbb"
| 47 || May 29 || @ Twins || 2–9 || Bonser (4–1) || Danks (3–5) || || 2:46 || 23,771 || 24–23 || box
|- style="background-color:#ffbbbb"
| 48 || May 30 || @ Twins || 6–7 || Nathan (2–1) || MacDougal (1–2) || || 2:48 || 29,042 || 24–24 || box
|- style="background-color:#ffbbbb"
| 49 || May 31 || @ Blue Jays || 0–2 || Halladay (5–2) || Buehrle (2–2) || Accardo (8) || 1:50 || 22,436 || 24–25 || box

|- style="background-color:#bbffbb"
| 50 || June 1 || @ Blue Jays || 3–0 || Vázquez (3–3) || Burnett (5–5) || Jenks (15) || 2:33 || 20,051 || 25–25 || box
|- style="background-color:#ffbbbb"
| 51 || June 2 || @ Blue Jays || 3–9 || McGowan (2–2) || MacDougal (1–3) || Janssen (2) || 2:41 || 25,691 || 25–26 || box
|- style="background-color:#ffbbbb"
| 52 || June 3 || @ Blue Jays || 3–4 || Tallet (2–1) || Masset (1–2) || Accardo (7) || 3:06 || 30,886 || 25–27 || box
|- style="background-color:#bbffbb"
| 53 || June 4 || Yankees || 6–4 || Garland (4–3) || DeSalvo (1–3) || Jenks (16) || 2:57 || 32,703 || 26–27 || box
|- style="background-color:#ffbbbb"
| 54 || June 5 || Yankees || 3–7 || Clippard (3–1) || Buehrle (2–3) || Rivera (6) || 3:08 || 30,895 || 26–28 || box
|- style="background-color:#ffbbbb"
| 55 || June 6 || Yankees || 1–5 || Wang (5–4) || Vázquez (3–4) || || 2:40 || 30,829 || 26–29 || box
|- style="background-color:#ffbbbb"
| 56 || June 7 || Yankees || 3–10 || Proctor (1–3) || Contreras (4–6) || Rivera (7) || 3:21 || 32,688 || 26–30 || box
|- style="background-color:#ffbbbb"
| 57 || June 8 || Astros || 2–5 || Sampson (6–5) || Danks (3–6) || Wheeler (11) || 2:45 || 33,212 || 26–31 || box
|- style="background-color:#ffbbbb"
| 58 || June 9 || Astros || 2–3 || Qualls (5–3) || Jenks (2–2) || || 3:01 || 36,616 || 26–32 || box
|- style="background-color:#bbffbb"
| 59 || June 10 || Astros || 6–3 || Buehrle (3–3) || Rodríguez (3–6) || Jenks (17) || 2:23 || 33,433 || 27–32 || box
|- style="background-color:#ffbbbb"
| 60 || June 11 || @ Phillies || 0–3 || Eaton (7–4) || Vázquez (3–5) || Alfonseca (5) || 2:31 || 31,989 || 27–33 || box
|- style="background-color:#ffbbbb"
| 61 || June 12 || @ Phillies || 3–7 || Hamels (9–2) || Contreras (4–7) || || 2:32 || 34,529 || 27–34 || box
|- style="background-color:#ffbbbb"
| 62 || June 13 || @ Phillies || 4–8 || Madson (1–2) || Thornton (2–2) || || 2:59 || 42,677 || 27–35 || box
|- style="background-color:#ffbbbb"
| 63 || June 15 || @ Pirates || 2–4 || Maholm (3–9) || Garland (4–4) || Capps (4) || 2:41 || 26,647 || 27–36 || box
|- style="background-color:#bbffbb"
| 64 || June 16 || @ Pirates || 6–1 || Buehrle (4–3) || Van Benschoten (0–1) || || 2:24 || 36,610 || 28–36 || box
|- style="background-color:#ffbbbb"
| 65 || June 17 || @ Pirates || 7–8 || Chacòn (3–1) || Masset (2–3) || Capps (5) || 2:48 || 26,830 || 28–37 || box
|- style="background-color:#bbffbb"
| 66 || June 18 || Marlins || 10–6 || Contreras (5–7) || Johnson (0–1) || Jenks (18) || 2:58 || 36,132 || 29–37 || box
|- style="background-color:#ffbbbb"
| 67 || June 19 || Marlins || 5–7 || Benítez (1–3) || Thornton (2–3) || Gregg (12) || 2:55 || 35,327 || 29–38 || box
|- style="background-color:#ffbbbb"
| 68 || June 20 || Marlins || 4–5 || Tankersley (4–1) || Garland (4–5) || Gregg (13) || 2:54 || 32,007 || 29–39 || box
|- style="background-color:#ffbbbb"
| 69 || June 22 || Cubs || 1–5 || Zambrano (8–6) || Buehrle (4–4) || || 2:33 || 39,046 || 29–40 || box
|- style="background-color:#ffbbbb"
| 70 || June 23 || Cubs || 1–2 || Wuertz (1–2) || Jenks (2–3) || Howry (1) || 2:57 || 39,043 || 29–41 || box
|- style="background-color:#ffbbbb"
| 71 || June 24 || Cubs || 0–3 || Marshall (4–2) || Contreras (5–8) || Howry (2) || 3:04 || 39,194 || 29–42 || box
|- style="background-color:#bbffbb"
| 72 || June 25 || @ Devil Rays || 5–4 || Danks (4–6) || Fossum (5–7) || Jenks (19) || 3:19 || 10,514 || 30–42 || box
|- style="background-color:#bbffbb"
| 73 || June 26 || @ Devil Rays || 6–1 || Garland (5–5) || Shields (6–3) || || 2:27 || 11,954 || 31–42 || box
|- style="background-color:#bbffbb"
| 74 || June 27 || @ Devil Rays || 5–3 || Buehrle (5–4) || Glover (3–3) || Jenks (20) || 3:03 || 10,492 || 32–42 || box
|- style="background-color:#bbffbb"
| 75 || June 28 || @ Devil Rays || 5–1 || Vázquez (4–5) || Kazmir (5–4) || || 2:52 || 13,496 || 33–42 || box
|- style="background-color:#ffbbbb"
| 76 || June 29 || @ Royals || 1–8 || Bannister (5–4) || Contreras (5–9) || Greinke (1) || 2:33 || 20,525 || 33–43 || box
|- style="background-color:#bbffbb"
| 77 || June 30 || @ Royals || 3 – 1  || Bukvich (1–0) || Dotel (0–1) || Jenks (21) || 2:41 || 25,119 || 34–43 || box

|- style="background-color:#bbffbb"
| 78 || July 1 || @ Royals || 3–1 || Garland (6–5) || Thomson (1–1) || Jenks (22) || 3:13 || 23,004 || 35–43 || box
|- style="background-color:#ffbbbb"
| 79 || July 2 || Orioles || 6–7 || Bell (1–1) || Jenks (2–4) || Ray (14) || 2:53 || 35,161 || 35–44 || box
|- style="background-color:#bbffbb"
| 80 || July 3 || Orioles || 5–1 || Vázquez (5–5) || Cabrera (6–9) || || 2:22 || 37,281 || 36–44 || box
|- style="background-color:#ffbbbb"
| 81 || July 4 || Orioles || 6–9 || Bell (2–1) || Contreras (5–10) || || 3:23 || 33,640 || 36–45 || box
|- style="background-color:#bbffbb"
| 82 || July 5 || Orioles || 11–6 || Danks (5–6) || Burres (4–3) || || 2:46 || 30,364 || 37–45 || box
|- style="background-color:#ffbbbb"
| 83 || July 6 || Twins || 14–20 || Baker (3–3) || Garland (6–6) || || 3:42 || 31,543 || 37–46 || box
|- style="background-color:#ffbbbb"
| 84 || July 6 || Twins || 0–12 || Garza (1–0) || Floyd (0–1) || || 3:02 || 32,426 || 37–47 || box
|- style="background-color:#bbffbb"
| 85 || July 7 || Twins || 3–1 || Buehrle (6–4) || Bonser (5–6) || Jenks (23) || 2:20 || 36,791 || 38–47 || box
|- style="background-color:#bbffbb"
| 86 || July 8 || Twins || 6–3 || Vázquez (6–5) || Silva (6–10) || || 2:20 || 32,724 || 39–47 || box
|- style=""
|colspan=11 style="background-color:#bbcaff" | All-Star Break: AL defeats NL 5–4 at AT&T Park
|- style="background-color:#bbffbb"
| 87 || July 12 || @ Orioles || 9–7 || Garland (7–6) || Guthrie (4–3) || Jenks (24) || 3:03 || 21,000 || 40–47 || box
|- style="background-color:#ffbbbb"
| 88 || July 13 || @ Orioles || 0–2 || Bédard (8–4) || Buehrle (6–5) || Ray (15) || 2:12 || 28,162 || 40–48 || box
|- style="background-color:#ffbbbb"
| 89 || July 14 || @ Orioles || 6 – 7  || Ray (5–6) || Haeger (0–1) || || 3:45 || 29,208 || 40–49 || box
|- style="background-color:#ffbbbb"
| 90 || July 15 || @ Orioles || 3–5 || Olson (1–0) || Contreras (5–11) || Ray (16) || 2:50 || 29,382 || 40–50 || box
|- style="background-color:#bbffbb"
| 91 || July 16 || @ Indians || 11–10 || Danks (6–6) || Lee (5–6) || Jenks (25) || 3:36 || 21,460 || 41–50 || box
|- style="background-color:#ffbbbb"
| 92 || July 17 || @ Indians || 5 – 6  || Betancourt (2–0) || Day (0–1) || || 3:58 || 21,321 || 41–51 || box
|- style="background-color:#bbffbb"
| 93 || July 18 || @ Indians || 5–1 || Buehrle (7–5) || Westbrook (1–5) || || 2:55 || 29,822 || 42–51 || box
|- style="background-color:#bbffbb"
| 94 || July 19 || @ Red Sox || 4–2 || Vázquez (7–5) || Matsuzaka (11–7) || Jenks (26) || 3:34 || 36,913 || 43–51 || box
|- style="background-color:#ffbbbb"
| 95 || July 20 || @ Red Sox || 3–10 || Beckett (13–3) || Contreras (5–12) || || 2:53 || 36,737 || 43–52 || box
|- style="background-color:#ffbbbb"
| 96 || July 21 || @ Red Sox || 2–11 || Gabbard (4–0) || Danks (6–7) || || 3:05 || 36,283 || 43–53 || box
|- style="background-color:#ffbbbb"
| 97 || July 22 || @ Red Sox || 5–8 || Wakefield (11–9) || Garland (7–7) || Papelbon (22) || 3:14 || 36,346 || 43–54 || box
|- style="background-color:#ffbbbb"
| 98 || July 23 || Tigers || 6–9 || Grilli (4–2) || Buehrle (7–6) || Jones (27) || 3:20 || 30,122 || 43–55 || box
|- style="background-color:#bbffbb"
| 99 || July 24 || Tigers || 5–3 ||Vázquez (8–5) || Bonderman (10–2) || Jenks (27) || 2:20 || 30,569 || 44–55 || box
|- style="background-color:#bbffbb"
| 100 || July 24 || Tigers || 8–7 || Thornton (3–3) || Miner (1–2) || Jenks (28) || 3:30 || 29,042 || 45–55 || box
|- style="background-color:#ffbbbb"
| 101 || July 25 || Tigers || 9–13 || Grilli (5–2) || Contreras (5–13) || Byrdak (1) || 3:27 || 28,462 || 45–56 || box
|- style="background-color:#bbffbb"
| 102 || July 26 || Tigers || 4–3 || Jenks (3–4) || Miner (1–3) || || 2:39 || 30,567 || 46–56 || box
|- style="background-color:#bbffbb"
| 103 || July 27 || Blue Jays || 4–3 || Garland (8–7) || Towers (5–7) || Jenks (29) || 2:42 || 34,590 || 47–56 || box
|- style="background-color:#bbffbb"
| 104 || July 28 || Blue Jays || 2–0 || Buehrle (8–6) || Halladay (11–5) || Jenks (30) || 2:07 || 37,744 || 48–56 || box
|- style="background-color:#ffbbbb"
| 105 || July 29 || Blue Jays || 1–4 || Marcum (7–4) || Vázquez (8–6) || Accardo (17) || 2:21 || 36,571 || 48–57 || box
|- style="background-color:#ffbbbb"
| 106 || July 31 || @ Yankees || 3–16 || Mussina (6–7) || Contreras (5–14) || || 2:59 || 53,958 || 48–58 || box

|- style="background-color:#ffbbbb"
| 107 || August 1 || @ Yankees || 1–8 || Pettitte (7–7) || Danks (6–8) || || 3:02 || 53,342 || 48–59 || box
|- style="background-color:#bbffbb"
| 108 || August 2 || @ Yankees || 13–9 || Logan (2–0) || Karstens (0–2) || || 3:59 || 54,869 || 49–59 || box
|- style="background-color:#bbffbb"
| 109 || August 3 || @ Tigers || 7–4 || Buehrle (9–6) || Miller (5–4) || || 2:46 || 42,066 || 50–59 || box
|- style="background-color:#bbffbb"
| 110 || August 4 || @ Tigers || 7–5 || Vázquez (9–6) || Bonderman (10–4) || Jenks (31) || 3:01 || 42,907 || 51–59 || box
|- style="background-color:#bbffbb"
| 111 || August 5 || @ Tigers || 3–1 || Floyd (1–1) || Tata (1–1) || Jenks (32) || 2:40 || 39,778 || 52–59 || box
|- style="background-color:#ffbbbb"
| 112 || August 7 || Indians || 1–2 || Westbrook (3–6) || Danks (6–9) || Borowski (31) || 2:46 || 32,315 || 52–60 || box
|- style="background-color:#bbffbb"
| 113 || August 8 || Indians || 6 – 4  || Contreras (6–14) || Fultz (3–2) || || 4:17 || 33,147 || 53–60 || box
|- style="background-color:#ffbbbb"
| 114 || August 9 || Indians || 5–7 || Laffey (1–1) || Buehrle (9–7) || Borowski (32) || 3:03 || 36,399 || 53–61 || box
|- style="background-color:#bbffbb"
| 115 || August 10 || Mariners || 5–3 || Vázquez (10–6) || Washburn (8–9) || Jenks (33) || 2:36 || 38,586 || 54–61 || box
|- style="background-color:#ffbbbb"
| 116 || August 11 || Mariners || 6–7 || Batista (12–8) || Floyd (1–2) || Putz (34) || 3:01 || 38,210 || 54–62 || box
|- style="background-color:#ffbbbb"
| 117 || August 12 || Mariners || 0–6 || Weaver (4–10) || Danks (6–10) || || 2:13 || 36,629 || 54–63 || box
|- style="background-color:#ffbbbb"
| 118 || August 14 || @ Athletics || 3–4 || DiNardo (7–6) || Garland (8–8) || Embree (15) || 2:44 || 24,082 || 54–64 || box
|- style="background-color:#ffbbbb"
| 119 || August 15 || @ Athletics || 2–3 || Blanton (10–8) || Buehrle (9–8) || Street (10) || 2:14 || 25,295 || 54–65 || box
|- style="background-color:#ffbbbb"
| 120 || August 16 || @ Athletics || 5 – 8  || Lugo (4–0) || Thornton (3–4) || || 3:32 || 20,218 || 54–66 || box
|- style="background-color:#ffbbbb"
| 121 || August 17 || @ Mariners || 4–5 || Batista (13–8) || Contreras (6–15) || Putz (35) || 2:50 || 46,170 || 54–67 || box
|- style="background-color:#ffbbbb"
| 122 || August 18 || @ Mariners || 5–7 || Weaver (5–10) || Danks (6–11) || Putz (36) || 2:31 || 41,121 || 54–68 || box
|- style="background-color:#ffbbbb"
| 123 || August 19 || @ Mariners || 5–11 || Hernández (9–6) || Garland (8–9) || || 2:54 || 45,668 || 54–69 || box
|- style="background-color:#bbffbb"
| 124 || August 20 || Royals || 4–3 || Thornton (4–4) || Riske (1–3) || Jenks (34) || 3:06 || 35,391 || 55–69 || box
|- style="background-color:#bbffbb"
| 125 || August 21 || Royals || 5–2 || Vázquez (11–6) || Núñez (2–1) || Jenks (35) || 3:01 || 35,309 || 56–69 || box
|- style="background-color:#ffbbbb"
| 126 || August 22 || Royals || 6–7 || Bannister (10–7) || Contreras (6–16) || || 3:11 || 31,739 || 56–70 || box
|- style="background-color:#bbbbbb"
| – || August 23 || Red Sox ||colspan=8| Postponed (rain), 
|- style="background-color:#ffbbbb"
| 127 || August 24 || Red Sox || 3–11 || Beckett (16–5) || Garland (8–10) || || 3:47 || 30,581 || 56–71 || box
|- style="background-color:#ffbbbb"
| 128 || August 24 || Red Sox || 1–10 || Schilling (8–5) || Danks (6–12) || || 2:44 || 37,639 || 56–72 || box
|- style="background-color:#ffbbbb"
| 129 || August 25 || Red Sox || 2–14 || Wakefield (16–10) || Buehrle (9–9) || || 3:10 || 38,874 || 56–73 || box
|- style="background-color:#ffbbbb"
| 130 || August 26 || Red Sox || 1–11 || Tavárez (7–9) || Vázquez (11–7) || || 2:59 || 36,745 || 56–74 || box
|- style="background-color:#bbffbb"
| 131 || August 27 || Devil Rays || 5–4 || Contreras (7–16) || Wheeler (1–6) || Jenks (36) || 2:26 || 37,030 || 57–74 || box
|- style="background-color:#ffbbbb"
| 132 || August 28 || @ Rangers || 3–4 || Littleton (1–1) || MacDougal (1–4) || Benoit (2) || 2:54 || 20,261 || 57–75 || box
|- style="background-color:#ffbbbb"
| 133 || August 29 || @ Rangers || 4 – 5  || Littleton (2–1) || Logan (2–1) || || 3:50 || 23,704 || 57–76 || box
|- style="background-color:#ffbbbb"
| 134 || August 30 || @ Rangers || 1–5 || Millwood (9–11) || Danks (6–13) || || 2:45 || 23,432 || 57–77 || box
|- style="background-color:#ffbbbb"
| 135 || August 31 || @ Indians || 5–8 || Fultz (4–2) || MacDougal (1–5) || Betancourt (1) || 3:01 || 38,325 || 57–78 || box

|- style="background-color:#ffbbbb"
| 136 || September 1 || @ Indians || 0–7 || Byrd (14–5) || Vázquez (11–8) || || 2:37 || 41,131 || 57–79 || box
|- style="background-color:#bbffbb"
| 137 || September 2 || @ Indians || 8–0 || Contreras (8–16) || Westbrook (5–8) || || 3:19 || 37,718 || 58–79 || box
|- style="background-color:#bbffbb"
| 138 || September 4 || @ Tigers || 3–1 || Garland (9–10) || Bonderman (11–8) || Jenks (37) || 3:04 || 32,505 || 59–79 || box
|- style="background-color:#ffbbbb"
| 139 || September 5 || @ Tigers || 1 – 2  || Seay (2–0) || Phillips (0–1) || || 3:44 || 32,980 || 59–80 || box
|- style="background-color:#ffbbbb"
| 140 || September 6 || @ Tigers || 2–3 || Seay (3–0) || Jenks (3–5) || || 2:42 || 35,977 || 59–81 || box
|- style="background-color:#bbffbb"
| 141 || September 7 || Twins || 11 – 10  || Phillips (1–1) || Rincón (3–3) || || 4:29 || 34,104 || 60–81 || box
|- style="background-color:#bbffbb"
| 142 || September 8 || Twins || 8–7 || Myers (4–0) || Cali (0–1) || Thornton (2) || 3:25 || 31,747 || 61–81 || box
|- style="background-color:#ffbbbb"
| 143 || September 9 || Twins || 2–5 || Santana (15–11) || Garland (9–11) || Nathan (30) || 2:37 || 32,250 || 61–82 || box
|- style="background-color:#ffbbbb"
| 144 || September 10 || Indians || 2–6 || Carmona (16–8) || Floyd (1–3) || || 2:53 || 30,126 || 61–83 || box
|- style="background-color:#ffbbbb"
| 145 || September 11 || Indians || 3–8 || Byrd (15–6) || Broadway (0–1) || || 3:23 || 31,939 || 61–84 || box
|- style="background-color:#bbffbb"
| 146 || September 12 || Indians || 7–4 || Vázquez (12–8) || Westbrook (5–9) || || 2:54 || 23,537 || 62–84 || box
|- style="background-color:#bbffbb"
| 147 || September 14 || Angels || 5–3 || Contreras (9–16) || Colón (6–7) || Jenks (38) || 2:51 || 33,581 || 63–84 || box
|- style="background-color:#ffbbbb"
| 148 || September 15 || Angels || 1–2 || Weaver (12–7) || Garland (9–12) || Rodríguez (35) || 3:13 || 36,485 || 63–85 || box
|- style="background-color:#bbffbb"
| 149 || September 16 || Angels || 9–7 || MacDougal (2–5) || Moseley (4–3) || || 3:06 || 29,010 || 64–85 || box
|- style="background-color:#bbffbb"
| 150 || September 17 || @ Royals || 11–3 || Vázquez (13–8) || Davies (6–14) || || 2:50 || 14,421 || 65–85 || box
|- style="background-color:#ffbbbb"
| 151 || September 18 || @ Royals || 2–3 || Meche (9–12) || Floyd (1–4) || Soria (16) || 2:38 || 15,015 || 65–86 || box
|- style="background-color:#bbffbb"
| 152 || September 19 || @ Royals || 7–0 || Contreras (10–16) || Bannister (12–9) || || 2:16 || 11,857 || 66–86 || box
|- style="background-color:#ffbbbb"
| 153 || September 20 || @ Royals || 0–3 || Greinke (7–6) || Garland (9–13) || Soria (17) || 1:55 || 10,264 || 66–87 || box
|- style="background-color:#bbffbb"
| 154 || September 21 || @ Twins || 6–4 || Buehrle (10–9) || Santana (15–13) || Jenks (39) || 2:29 || 27,928 || 67–87 || box
|- style="background-color:#bbffbb"
| 155 || September 22 || @ Twins || 8–3 || Vázquez (14–8) || Baker (9–9) || || 2:57 || 31,737 || 68–87 || box
|- style="background-color:#ffbbbb"
| 156 || September 23 || @ Twins || 1–7 || Slowey (4–0) || Floyd (1–5) || || 2:43 || 29,382 || 68–88 || box
|- style="background-color:#ffbbbb"
| 157 || September 25 || Royals || 5–9 || Duckworth (3–5) || Wassermann (0–1) || || 3:20 || 31,607 || 68–89 || box
|- style="background-color:#bbffbb"
| 158 || September 26 || Royals || 3–0 || Garland (10–13) || Greinke (7–7) || || 2:21 || 32,091 || 69–89 || box
|- style="background-color:#bbffbb"
| 159 || September 27 || Royals || 10–0 || Broadway (1–1) || Buckner (1–2) || || 2:30 || 34,477 || 70–89 || box
|- style="background-color:#bbffbb"
| 160 || September 28 || Tigers || 5–2 || Vázquez (15–8) || Rogers (3–4) || Jenks (40) || 2:40 || 30,281 || 71–89 || box
|- style="background-color:#bbffbb"
| 161 || September 29 || Tigers || 3–2 || Wassermann (1–1) || Rodney (2–6) || || 2:47 || 33,066 || 72–89 || box
|- style="background-color:#ffbbbb"
| 162 || September 30 || Tigers || 3–13 || Robertson (9–13) || Contreras (10–17) || || 3:04 || 33,154 || 72–90 || box

Opening Day lineup 

Pablo Ozuna, LF

Darin Erstad, CF

Jim Thome, DH

Paul Konerko, 1B

Jermaine Dye, RF

Joe Crede, 3B

Tadahito Iguchi, 2B

A. J. Pierzynski, C

Juan Uribe, SS

José Contreras, P

Roster

Player stats

Batting 
Note: G = Games played; AB = At Bats; R = Runs scored; H = Hits; 2B = Doubles; 3B = Triples; HR = Home runs; RBI = Runs batted in; BB = Base on balls; SO = Strikeouts; AVG = Batting average; SB = Stolen bases

Pitching 
Note: W = Wins; L = Losses; ERA = Earned run average; G = Games pitched; GS = Games started; SV = Saves; IP = Innings pitched; H = Hits allowed; R = Runs allowed; ER = Earned runs allowed; HR = Home runs allowed; BB = Walks allowed; K = Strikeouts

Farm system

References 

 Game Logs:
1st Half: Chicago White Sox Game Log on ESPN.com
2nd Half: Chicago White Sox Game Log on ESPN.com
 Batting Statistics: Chicago White Sox Batting Stats on ESPN.com
 Pitching Statistics: Chicago White Sox Pitching Stats on ESPN.com

External links 

 2007 Chicago White Sox at Baseball Reference

Chicago White Sox seasons
Chicago White Sox season
White